Ariel Pietrasik (born 21 October 1999) is a Polish handball player for TSV St. Otmar St. Gallen and the Polish national team.

References

1999 births
Living people
Sportspeople from Łódź
Expatriate handball players
Polish male handball players